Collbató is a municipality in the comarca of the Baix Llobregat in Catalonia, Spain.  It is situated on the southern slopes of Montserrat.  The area has been inhabited since at least 4000 BC, as shown by Neolithic remains found in caves above the village (on display at the museum at the monastery of Montserrat). Although agriculture (olives, grapes and almonds) is the major economic activity, the village is also home to a workshop for the manufacture of organs.

Images 
Collbato pictures

Demography

References 

 Panareda Clopés, Josep Maria; Rios Calvet, Jaume; Rabella Vives, Josep Maria (1989). Guia de Catalunya, Barcelona: Caixa de Catalunya.  (Spanish).  (Catalan).

External links
 Government data pages 

Municipalities in Baix Llobregat